Timothy J. McKay (1947 – July 30, 2006) was an environmentalist and executive director of the non-profit Northcoast Environmental Center, a transportation advocacy organization, in Arcata, California.

Education 
McKay graduated from Humboldt State University and was a long-term resident of Trinidad, California.

Career 
McKay worked on projects for the protection of northern spotted owl, the preservation of the Siskiyou Wilderness and in the investigation of the death of salmon in the Klamath River.

Personal life 
On July 30, 2006, McKay died of a heart attack in Stone Lagoon of Humboldt Lagoons State Park in Humboldt County, California, U.S.. He was 59.

References

American essayists
People from Solano County, California
California State Polytechnic University, Humboldt alumni
People from Arcata, California
1947 births
2006 deaths
People from Trinidad, California
Activists from California
20th-century essayists